Neoconocephalus caudellianus, or Caudell's conehead, is a species of conehead in the family Tettigoniidae. It is found in North America.

References

caudellianus
Articles created by Qbugbot
Insects described in 1905